Marilyn Shrude (born July 6, 1946) is an American composer of contemporary classical music and pianist, and Distinguished Artist Professor of composition at Bowling Green State University, since 1977.

Life 
Born in Chicago, Illinois, Shrude graduated from Alverno College and Northwestern University. Her composition instructors include Alan Stout and M. William Karlins.

She is the founder and former director of the Mid-American Center for Contemporary Music and co-directs the Annual New Music & Art Festival. She served as visiting professor of music at Indiana University (Bloomington) in the fall of 1998, Heidelberg College (spring 2001), and Oberlin College (spring 2004), and has also taught at the Interlochen Arts Camp (1990–1997).

Her scores are published by American Composers Alliance, Éditions Henry Lemoine (Paris), Neue Musik Verlag Berlin, Southern Music, and Thomas House. Her music has been recorded by the New World, Albany, EROL, Liscio, FoxGlove, MMC, Capstone, Orion, Centaur, Neuma, Access, and Ohio Brassworks labels.

Her husband is the classical saxophonist John Sampen, and her daughter the classical/contemporary violinist Maria Sampen, both of whom have performed many of her works. Her son, producer, actor and rock guitarist, is David Sampen.

Awards 
She is the winner of a Kennedy Center Friedheim Award (third place, 1984) and a recipient of an American Academy of Arts and Letters Lifetime Achievement Award.
She won a 1998 Cleveland Arts Prize for Music.
She is also a 2011 Guggenheim Fellow.

References

External links
Marilyn Shrude official site

ACA Festival of American Music 2008: Marilyn Shrude
Interview with Marilyn Shrude, March 14, 2001

1946 births
20th-century American composers
20th-century American pianists
20th-century American women pianists
20th-century classical composers
21st-century American composers
21st-century American pianists
21st-century American women pianists
21st-century classical composers
21st-century classical pianists
Alverno College alumni
American classical composers
American women classical composers
American women classical pianists
American classical pianists
Bienen School of Music alumni
Bowling Green State University faculty
Classical musicians from Illinois
Heidelberg University (Ohio)
Indiana University faculty
Living people
Musicians from Chicago
20th-century women composers
21st-century women composers
American women academics